Francesco Ascani (born 16 April 1952, in Perugia) is an Italian auto racing driver. He was champion in the inaugural season of the Italian Superstars Series in 2004, driving a BMW M5.

External links
Profile at Superstars Series official website

1952 births
Living people
Italian racing drivers
Sportspeople from Perugia
Superstars Series drivers